The University of Teramo is an Italian public research university located in Teramo, Italy. The academic institution was officially established in 1993 after having been a detached section of the D'Annunzio University of Chieti–Pescara for over 30 years.

Background
The University of Teramo, which holds one of the most modern campuses in Italy, offers 5 faculties 24 degree courses, 35 Masters, 6 postgraduate schools and 10 departments. The entire 50,000 sq m of the Coste Sant'Agostino Campus holds the faculties of Law, Communication Sciences, and Political Science. A scientific pole is currently underway and will house the faculties of Veterinary Medicine and Agriculture. It consists of a very up-to-date facility of 100,000 sq m which will also accommodate an animal Hospital and a Sanitary Dog Kennel. The Campus and Pole are two realities symbolizing the core areas of the University: the legal, political and communicative areas together with the agro-bio-veterinary area which represent two centers of excellence of the University of Teramo. Communication technologies have always influenced both thought and learning methods. As a result, facilities more and more necessary to the knowledge society such as language, multimedia, television laboratories, the university newspaper, and radio station, have been carried out. 
The University is living a strong period of internationalization through offering scholarships to students from all over of the world.

Trivia 
In 1991 Joseph Ratzinger led in the University of Teramo on a convention called “Capitalism and Social Rights”.
According to a research conducted by the influential institution Censis Repubblica the University of Teramo ranks #2 in the list of best Italian universities under 10.000 students.

Organization

These are the 5 faculties in which the university is divided into:

 Faculty of Agriculture
 Faculty of Communication Science
 Faculty of Law
 Faculty of Political Science
 Faculty of Veterinary Medicine

Notable people

Faculty
Amongst the best-known professors who teach or have taught at the University of Teramo there are:

 Giacinto Auriti
 Renato Brunetta
 Rocco Buttiglione
 Gianni Cuperlo
 Michel Martone
 Lorenzo Ornaghi
 Marco Pannella
 Roberto Vecchioni

See also 
 List of Italian universities
 Teramo

References

External links
University of Teramo Website 

 
Educational institutions established in 1993
1993 establishments in Italy